In enzymology, a propanediol-phosphate dehydrogenase is an enzyme that catalyzes the chemical reaction

propane-1,2-diol 1-phosphate + NAD+  hydroxyacetone phosphate + NADH + H+

Thus, the two substrates of this enzyme are propane-1,2-diol 1-phosphate and NAD+, whereas its 3 products are hydroxyacetone phosphate, NADH, and H+.

This enzyme belongs to the family of oxidoreductases, specifically those acting on the CH-OH group of donor with NAD+ or NADP+ as acceptor. The systematic name of this enzyme class is propane-1,2-diol-1-phosphate:NAD+ oxidoreductase. Other names in common use include PDP dehydrogenase, 1,2-propanediol-1-phosphate:NAD+ oxidoreductase, and propanediol phosphate dehydrogenase.

References

External links 

EC 1.1.1
NADH-dependent enzymes
Enzymes of unknown structure